The Fatal Feast (also referred to as "The Fatal Feast (Waste in Space)") is the fifth studio album by American crossover thrash band Municipal Waste. It was released on April 10, 2012 through Nuclear Blast. The album debuted at number 1 on the Billboard New Artist chart. The artwork was done by Justin Osbourn of Slasher Design.

Track listing

Personnel
 Tony Foresta – vocals
 Ryan Waste – guitars
 Dave Witte – drums
 Land Phil – bass

Additional personnel
 Steve Moore – samples on "Waste in Space (Main Title)" and "The Fatal Feast"
 John Connelly – vocals on "The Fatal Feast"
 Tim Barry – vocals on "Standards and Practices"

References

2012 albums
Municipal Waste (band) albums
Nuclear Blast albums